The Swartland Local Municipality consists of twenty-three members elected by mixed-member proportional representation. Twelve councillors are elected by first-past-the-post voting in twelve wards, while the remaining eleven are chosen from party lists so that the total number of party representatives is proportional to the number of votes received. In the election of 1 November 2021 the Democratic Alliance (DA) obtained a majority of fourteen seats on the council.

Results 
The following table shows the composition of the council after past elections.

December 2000 election

The following table shows the results of the 2000 election.

October 2002 floor crossing

In terms of the Eighth Amendment of the Constitution and the judgment of the Constitutional Court in United Democratic Movement v President of the Republic of South Africa and Others, in the period from 8–22 October 2002 councillors had the opportunity to cross the floor to a different political party without losing their seats. In the Drakenstein council, the single councillor of the Verenigde Gemeenskap Organisasie crossed to the African National Congress.

By-elections from October 2002 to August 2004
The following by-elections were held to fill vacant ward seats in the period between the floor crossing periods in October 2002 and September 2004.

March 2006 election

The following table shows the results of the 2006 election.

By-elections from March 2006 to May 2011
The following by-elections were held to fill vacant ward seats in the period between period between the elections in March 2006 and May 2011.

May 2011 election

The following table shows the results of the 2011 election.

By-elections from May 2011 to August 2016
The following by-elections were held to fill vacant ward seats in the period between the elections in May 2011 and August 2016.

August 2016 election

The following table shows the results of the 2016 election.

The local council sends four representatives to the council of the West Coast District Municipality: three from the Democratic Alliance and one from the African National Congress.

November 2021 election

The following table shows the results of the 2021 election.

References

Swartland
Elections in the Western Cape